Sanballat II was hereditary governor of Samaria under the Achaemenid Empire. He reigned during the early and mid fourth century BCE. Sanballat was a grandson of Sanballat the Horonite, who is mentioned in the Book of Nehemiah and the Elephantine papyri. Sanballat may have constructed the Samaritan Temple on Mount Gerizim.

Sanballat was the father of Hananiah, who was governor of Samaria after his father's death.

There has been some speculation (discussed by Dus̆ek) that Sanballat II may not have existed, certainly not with that name.

References

External links
 

Ancient Samaritan people
People whose existence is disputed
Samaritan culture and history